Princesses is an American television sitcom that aired on CBS from September 27 to October 25, 1991. The series was produced by Universal Television and lasted five episodes. The series theme song, "Someday My Prince Will Come" (from Disney's animated film Snow White and the Seven Dwarfs), was written by Frank Churchill and Larry Morey, and was performed by The Roches.

Synopsis
The series chronicles the lives of three female roommates in New York City, each with a different background and upbringing, thus the series' title: Tracy Dillon (Julie Hagerty), a ditzy English teacher who dumps her fiancé after learning about his previous two marriages; Tracy's longtime best friend Melissa Kirshner (Fran Drescher), an outspoken Jewish-American who sells cosmetics at a department store; and Georgina "Georgy" de La Rue (Twiggy), a naive recently widowed English princess (and whose previous occupation was that of a showgirl) who arrives to the States to challenge her late husband's contested will. The idea of the three being roommates in the same apartment was by accident thanks to the apartment's owner Tony, who promised Tracy and Georgy the use of the rent-free building without telling either one who would use it or to whom he had loaned it.

Cast
Julie Hagerty as Tracy Dillon
Fran Drescher as Melissa Kirshner
Twiggy as Princess Georgina "Georgy" de La Rue

Recurring
Leila Kenzle as Debra Kleckner, Melissa's snooty sister

Notable Guest Stars
James Read as Michael Decrow, Tracy's fiancé ("Pilot")
Leann Hunley as Andrea Sussman, Mike's business partner and ex-wife ("Pilot")
Peter Hobbs as the Reverend ("Pilot")
Bradford Tatum as Mike, Tracy's student ("Luv Leddahs")
Richard Kind as Dr. Len Kleckner, Melissa's dentist brother-in-law ("My Price Will Gum")
William Daniels as Harrison Fadiman ("The Snob Who Came to Dinner")
Charles Dennis as Charles Hawkenberry ("The Snob Who Came to Dinner")
Rod Loomis as Edward ("Tall, Dark, and Hansom")

Production and cancellation
Prior to the show's premiere, entertainment media outlets such as Entertainment Tonight began publicizing the show's behind-the-scenes woes. In an effort to downplay the behind-the-scenes turmoil on Princesses, CBS execs initially touted the series as "promising" to advertisers. However, upon its premiere, Princesses received negative reviews and placed last in the Nielsen ratings for its timeslot.

On October 14, Universal Television and Hagerty announced that Hagerty had departed the series in a mutual decision. While producers were planning to create a storyline to write off and replace Hagerty's character, CBS cancelled the series and pulled it from the air.

Following the series cancellation, Drescher and Lawson remained good friends as the latter returned to England. While going to visit Lawson in England, Drescher accidentally ran into CBS programming head Jeff Sagansky on her flight, and he gave Drescher a chance to pitch her own series. While visiting Lawson, Drescher came up with the idea of what would become The Nanny.

Episodes

Reception
The series received negative reviews. The show ended up ranking 118th out of 132 shows that season, averaging only a 6.3 household rating.

In 2010, TV Land aired the series as part of their TV Land Sunday Spotlight series.

References

External links
 

CBS original programming
Television series by Universal Television
1990s American sitcoms
1991 American television series debuts
1991 American television series endings
Television shows set in New York City
Television series about princesses